Makhtar Sop Diop (born June 1960 in Dakar) is a Senegalese economist and politician who has been serving as the managing director of the International Finance Corporation (IFC) since 2021, making him the first African to hold the position.
 
Diop earlier served as Minister of Finance and Economy in the second government of Moustapha Niasse, under President Abdoulaye Wade. He joined the World Bank in 2001 and served as vice president for Africa between 2012 and 2018 and as vice president for Infrastructure from 2018 to 2021.  On March 1, 2021, Diop was named managing director and Executive Vice President of the International Finance Corporation, a sister organization of the World Bank.

Early life and education 
Diop completed his postgraduate studies in economics at the University of Warwick and the University of Nottingham (UK), in Macroeconomics and Econometrics. He also earned a master's degree in finance in Paris, France.

Career

Early career 
Diop began his career as a financial analyst and authorized agent for the Union of Senegalese Banks (USB), in Dakar.

Between 1986 and 1993, Diop was technical advisor to the Senegalese Ministry of Economy and Finance.

From 1997 to 2000, he worked for the International Monetary Fund as an economist.

Minister of Economy and Finance, 2000–2001 
In April 2000, Diop was appointed Minister of Economy and Finance in the second government of Prime Minister Moustapha Niasse, and remained in this position until May 2001. During the period, Diop chaired the Council of Ministers of the West African Economic and Monetary Union.

During his time in office, Diop initiated a restructuring of the Customs and modernization of the Treasury. He launched Senegal’s first "Sovereign Debt Credit Rating" with Standard and Poor’s and played a role in the merger and the Omega Plan MRAP which led to NEPAD.

Career at the World Bank 
Since October 2001, Diop has been working for the World Bank. He was Country Director for Kenya, Somalia and Eritrea; Sector Director for Finance, Private Sector and Infrastructure for Latin America and the Caribbean; Director of Operations and Strategy for Latin America and the Caribbean; and Country Director for Brazil (2009 – 2012).

The World Bank's Country Partnership Strategy (2012-2015) for Brazil was developed under Diop's leadership.

On May 1, 2012, Diop was appointed by World Bank President Robert Zoellick as the institution's vice president for Africa, responsible for Sub-Saharan countries. For six years, he oversaw the delivery of $70 billion to Sub-Saharan Africa to help tackle development challenges. On July 1, 2018, he was appointed vice president for Infrastructure. He is in charge of the World Bank portfolio for Energy & Extractives, Transport, Digital Development, Infrastructure Finance, Public-Private Partnerships (PPPs), and Guarantees. 
On March 1, 2021, Diop was named Managing Director of the International Finance Corporation, a sister organization of the World Bank.

Recognition 
Diop has been named one of the 100 most influential Africans in the world by various magazines. In 2015, he received the Regents’ Lectureship Award from the University of California, Berkeley.

References 

Senegalese politicians
World Bank people
Finance ministers of Senegal
Economy ministers of Senegal
1960 births
Living people
Senegalese officials of the United Nations